Seth Abner (born June 30, 1995), also known as scump, scumperjumper or The King of COD is a former American professional Call of Duty player who last played for the  Call of Duty League team OpTic Texas. Abner is a two time Major League Gaming (MLG) X Games gold medalist. During the first ever Esports Awards in 2016, Scump won the Esports Console Player of the Year award. In August 2017, Scump achieved his first ever Call of Duty World Championship. Abner is sponsored by several gaming hardware companies, including Turtle Beach and Scuf Gaming. As of December 15, 2018, Scump has more than $600,000 from tournament winnings, of which $261,250 was won in Call of Duty: Infinite Warfare. He also runs a YouTube channel that currently has obtained over 2.6 million subscribers and over 590 million channel views as of January 24, 2021. He is widely considered to be one of the greatest Call of Duty players of all time.

In March 2021, Scump became the first Esport athlete to be sponsored by Oakley.

Call of Duty esports career

Call of Duty: Black Ops II (2012–2013 season)

Scump played for OpTic for the Call of Duty: Black Ops II season. OpTic would take their only 1st-place finish at UMG Chicago, but would never finish outside of the top 10. OpTic achieved a 3rd-place finish at the 2013 Call of Duty Championship to finish off the 2012–2013 season.

Call of Duty: Ghosts (2013–2014 season)

Scump stayed on OpTic going into the Call of Duty: Ghosts season. However, after a 9th-place finish at the MLG Fall Championship and a 13th-place finish at UMG Philadelphia, Scump announced he would be leaving OpTic and joining Team EnVyUs alongside Merk, ProoFy, and Goonjar because of a rivalry with Nadeshot. Less than two-weeks after his departure from OpTic, Scump announced that he was leaving Envy and returning to Optic. He would rejoin the lineup of Nadeshot, MBoZe, and Clayster for the Call of Duty Championship 2014. The squad finished 3rd for the second year in a row. After that tournament, the team picked up ProoFy to replace MBoZe, who then became captain of OpTic Nation. The new team placed in the top eight at UGC Niagara, and was invited to attend the MLG X Games Invitational. Here, OpTic advanced all the way through their bracket to face Team Kaliber in the Grand Final. OpTic won, and Scump become one of the first gold medalists for Call of Duty. The next few events were inconsistent for OpTic, with 4th and 5th placings at Gfinity 3, UMG Dallas, UMG Nashville, and MLG CoD League Season 3 Playoffs.

Call of Duty: Advanced Warfare (2014–2015 season)

Upon release of Call of Duty: Advanced Warfare, OpTic parted ways with Clayster and ProoFy and added Matt "Formal" Piper, Ian "Crimsix" Porter to the team. The team initially placed second to Crimsix's longtime teammate Aches at the first event of the season, and afterwards placed first at UMG Orlando 2015, the MLG Pro League Season 1 Playoffs, and the Call of Duty Championship's NA Regional event. At the 2015 Call of Duty World Championship, the team placed a disappointing 7th after they went into the event as the clear favorites. After the event, Scumps's longtime teammate, Nadeshot, decided to leave competitive Call of Duty and was replaced by Damon "Karma" Barlow, with Scump becoming the team captain. As the new captain of OpTic Gaming, Scump led the team to 6 more championships and 2 more Pro League Regular Season wins to end the Advanced Warfare season. They won ESWC Zénith 2015 and Gfinity Spring Masters 1 with Enable in place of Karma, but as they returned to the United States they went to California to compete at UMG California 2015 with Karma. When they won UMG Cali it marked their 3rd straight event win in three consecutive weekends in three different countries. They then finished 1st in Season 2 of the MLG Pro League to qualify for MLG Pro League Season 2 Playoffs at the summer XGAMES in Austin, Texas, where he and OpTic defended their title and won his second gold medal. OpTic and Scump then finished 2nd to FaZe Clan at UMG Dallas 2015 and Gfinity Summer Championship. They bounced back as they won UMG Washington D.C. 2015 and MLG Pro League Season 3 Regular Season, where they went 11–0 in the season. Once again, they fell short and placed 2nd to Scump's ex-teammate, Clayster's FaZe team for the final time in AW. Scump then went on to win the final event of Advanced Warfare, MLG World Finals, with OpTic Gaming. He stated that the World Finals was the only event where he felt like he got carried, but it still marked Scump's and OpTic's most successful year by far. They won 9 championships, all 3 of the online Pro League Season, appeared in 10/11 Grand Finals, they won many online tournaments hosted by MLG and UMG, earned 1,651,320 pro points, and Scump had the most pro points out of any player with 447,975.

Call of Duty: Black Ops III (2015–2016 season)

Going into the Call of Duty: Black Ops III season Scump confirmed that OpTic Gaming would not be making any roster changes, like many other teams. OpTic Gaming went on to successfully qualify for the Call of Duty World League NA. OpTic gaming placed 2nd in the first event of the season, the "Totino's invitational", losing to Rise Nation in the final. After entering the next event with a top-4 seed, Seth and his team were met an even worse placing of 4–8 along with the other top-seeded teams, however the event suffered from technical difficulties leading to an apology from the event's management. Scump has won now two 25k tournaments hosted by UMG gaming and one 25k tournament hosted by ESL.

Alongside teammates Crimsix and FormaL, and Karma, Scump won the 2016 Call of Duty World League Stage One Finals Tournament of North America for Call of Duty: Black Ops III. The tournament was presented by PS4 with a grand prize of $250,000 for the winning team. Scump also won MLG Anaheim and MLG Orlando with OpTic Gaming.

Call of Duty: Infinite Warfare (2016–2017 season)

After competing at four Call of Duty World Championship events and failing to win first place at any, Scump achieved success at the 2017 Call of Duty World League Championship in the title of Call of Duty: Infinite Warfare. His team, Optic Gaming won first prize ($1.5 million) in the Call of Duty World League final.

Call of Duty: World War II (2017–2018 season) 
Initially, Scump remained the leader of OpTic Gaming going into WWII. After inconsistent placings at numerous major events, the roster split up after a series of poor tournament placings, with Scump performing badly individually. They kicked FormaL and Karma and recruited players Sam 'Octane' Larew and Anthony 'Methodz' Zinni. But their problems weren't solved, as they placed 5–6th at the CWL Anaheim open, 7–8th at stage two playoffs and 17–24th in the 2018 Call of Duty Championship. This was the first time since Modern Warfare 2 that OpTic Gaming failed to win a single championship throughout a season. OpTic Gaming later cut the two players that they had picked up the year before and picked up two prospects going into Black Ops 4: Thomas 'TJHaly' Haly and Brandon 'Dashy' Otell.

Call of Duty: Black Ops 4 (2018–2019 season) 
At the beginning of the Call of Duty: Black Ops 4 season Scump teamed up with Karma, Crimsix, TJHaly and Dashy, as this was the first year that competitive Call of Duty used a five-man roster. OpTic Gaming won the first Black ops 4 tournament, CWL Las Vegas 2018, bringing home $100,000. As of 2019 Scump has had the 5th highest earnings in Call of Duty history ($652,140).

Call of Duty: Modern Warfare (2019–2020 season) 
Ahead of the 2019–2020 season CDL season, Scump announced via his personal Twitter account that he had left OpTic Gaming. On October 24, 2019, it was announced by NRG Esports via its social media channels that Scump had joined its currently unnamed CDL franchise, which on October 30, 2019, would be named Chicago Huntsmen.

Personal life
Seth was born on June 30, 1995, to Kristen and Shawn Abner, who is a retired professional baseball player.

He graduated from Cumberland Valley High School in Mechanicsburg, Pennsylvania, in 2013.

Books

References

External links

Call of Duty players
OpTic Gaming players
American esports players
People from Cumberland County, Pennsylvania
Team Envy players
Living people
1995 births
Twitch (service) streamers